"Feel It All" is the second single from German rock band Tokio Hotel's fifth studio album Kings of Suburbia. It was released on 3 April 2015. The single includes the original version of "Feel It All", a live version performed at Brandenburg Gate, a remix made by a Los Angeles-based DJ Pionear and remix versions of the previous single Love Who Loves You Back by Pionear and Swedish electronic music duo Cazzette.

Music video
The music video was shot in Berlin. It shows the life of a group of substance-dependent people.  It reflects the real life of drug-addicted people: how they use drugs, do unpredicted things, become aggressive and die of overdose. Bill Kaulitz plays the main role. The video starts with a small interview with Bill as a drug-addicted person. He is asked what is his favorite childhood memory but he doesn't remember. Then he walks alone along the streets and finds a group of other drug-addicted people. Once Bill wastes all his money on drugs he turns to prostitution to buy more drugs.

Track listing
CD maxi single, *Digital download EP

Release history

References

Tokio Hotel songs
2015 singles
2014 songs
Polydor Records singles
Island Records singles
Song recordings produced by Rock Mafia
Songs written by Bill Kaulitz
Songs written by Tom Kaulitz
Songs written by Joacim Persson
Songs written by David Jost